Francis Anthony Tulloch (5 August 1940 – 23 June 2022) was a Jamaican politician, lawyer and diplomat who served as Minister of Tourism from 1997 to 1999.

Early life and education
Tulloch was born to father Samuel Vincent Tulloch and mother Rhea Henriques-Tulloch  in Kingston, Jamaica on 5 August 1940. He was educated at St. George's College.

Career

Legal career
Tulloch was admitted to Lincoln's Inn on 23 September 1959. He was called to the bar on 5 February 1963. On his return to Jamaica, he practised as a barrister. From 1964 to 1969 he practiced law in Nassau, Bahamas serving as Legal Professional Assistant to Sir Lynden Pindling, future Prime Minister of The Bahamas. Tulloch later returned to Jamaica and resumed his law practice, this time doing less criminal law and engaging himself in political work on behalf of the People's National Party (PNP).

Political career
Tulloch was first elected to Parliament in 1972 from the Saint James Central constituency, representing the People's National Party. From 1976 to 1980, he represented the Saint James West Central constituency. After the People's National Party decided not to contest the 1983 general election, Tulloch returned to his law practice. From 1993 to 1997 he was Member of Parliament for the Hanover Eastern constituency, and from 1997 to 2002, he represented Saint James North Western.

Tulloch was Minister of State in the Ministry of Tourism from 1993 to 1995. He served as Jamaica's Minister of Tourism from 1997 to 1999 in the government of P. J. Patterson.

Diplomatic career
Tulloch was appointed Honorary Consul of the Russian Federation in Montego Bay on 27 May 2014.

Personal life
Tulloch married Doreen Perry Ellis on 19 August 1989. He is the father of four sons and two daughters.
Tulloch died on 23 June 2022.

References

1940 births
2022 deaths
20th-century Jamaican lawyers
People from Kingston, Jamaica
People's National Party (Jamaica) politicians
Members of the House of Representatives of Jamaica
Government ministers of Jamaica
Tourism ministers of Jamaica
Jamaican expatriates in the Bahamas
20th-century Jamaican politicians
21st-century Jamaican politicians